Berdichevsky or Berdyczewski is a family name derived from the city of Berdichev, Ukraine. It may refer to:

Cecilia Berdichevsky, Argentinian computer scientist 
, Jewish Hero of the Soviet Union
Micha Josef Berdyczewski (1865 — 1921), Ukrainian-born writer and journalist